Delila Hatuel (born November 15, 1980) is an Israeli Olympic foil fencer.  She represented Israel at the 2008 Summer Olympics, and has been ranked ninth in the world.

Biography
Delila Hatuel born in Acre, Israel.  Her brother Maor Hatuel is also a fencer, as is her aunt, Olympian Lydia Hatuel-Czuckermann, and her uncle, Olympian Yitzhak Hatuel.  Delila, her father, and Lydia train Jewish and Arab children in fencing at Acre's Olympic Fencing Center.

Fencing career
Hatuel finished ninth in the team foil 1997 World Fencing Championships in Cape Town, South Africa, and eighth in the team foil 1998 European Fencing Championships in Plovdiv, Bulgaria.

In July 2007, Hatuel finished sixth in individual foil at the European Fencing Championships, in Ghent, Belgium.  Throughout 2008, she finished in the top 10 in the Fencing World Cup circuit, and was ranked in the top 16 in the world.

In April 2008, she was ranked 9th in the world in women's foil.  In July 2008, at the 2008 European Fencing Championships in Kyiv, Ukraine, she defeated Olympic foil champion Valentina Vezzali, but injured her knee at the end of the bout. She finished seventh in individual foil in the tournament.

Her injury included a torn anterior cruciate ligament, which had to be surgically repaired. She underwent treatment in a hyperbaric oxygen chamber at Assaf Harofeh Medical Center in Tzrifin, Israel, so that she would be well enough to compete at the 2008 Summer Olympics. Exposure to oxygen under high pressure speeds up the body's natural healing process.

Hatuel, then ranked 11th in the world, represented Israel at the 2008 Summer Olympics in Beijing, China, in foil fencing, at 27 years of age.  She came in 19th, losing 10–9 to reigning world title holder Viktoriya Nikishina of Russia, who was part of the gold medal-winning Russian team. Hatuel tied the match with less than a minute remaining, and was defeated in overtime. Hatuel later said:  "I'm sad, but this loss has nothing to do with my injury.  I lost in a tight match."  However, a reporter for Haaretz said "it seems that Hatuel's knee injury was agonizing". Hatuel said she would be undergoing further surgery and hoped to participate at the 2012 Summer Olympics in London.

In 2009, Hatuel won the gold medal at the 2009 Maccabiah Games in women's foil.

In 2014 she won the European Games Baku Senior Women's Foil Qualification Tournament in Budapest, Hungary.

She took 24th at the 2015 European Senior Women Foil Championships in Montreux, Switzerland, and 31st at the 2016 European Senior Women Foil Championships in Torun, Poland.`

Hatuel was ranked 9th in the world in 2016, and qualified to fence in the 2016 Summer Olympics in Rio in Women's foil by virtue of her performance at the Championnats De Qualification Europeans on April 16, 2016, in Prague, Czech Republic. But the Israel Olympic Committee applied higher standards than did the International Olympic Committee—whose standards she met, and Hatuel was not allowed to fence at the 2016 Summer Olympic.

See also
List of select Jewish fencers
Sports in Israel

References

External links

 
 Delila Hatuel at Eurofencing (archived)
 Delila Hatuel at nahouw.net (archived)

1980 births
Living people
Israeli female foil fencers
Jewish female foil fencers
Jewish sportswomen
Israeli Jews
Olympic fencers of Israel
Fencers at the 2008 Summer Olympics
People from Acre, Israel
Maccabiah Games gold medalists for Israel
Maccabiah Games medalists in fencing
European Games competitors for Israel
Fencers at the 2015 European Games